Boulon Forest is a protected forest in Burkina Faso. 
It is located in Comoé Province.

It is located at an altitude of 313 meters. Boulon Forest is situated south of Sadara.

References

Protected areas of Burkina Faso
Comoé Province